Baron Arthur Pavlovich von Mohrenheim (8 June 1824 – 19 October 1906) was a diplomat of the Russian Empire who served as ambassador to France from 1884 to 1897 and played a leading role in arranging the Franco-Russian Alliance. He served in the embassies in Vienna (1851–1856) and Berlin (1858–1867) before being appointed minister to Denmark in 1867. In 1882 he was named ambassador to the United Kingdom, where he served for two years before moving to France as ambassador in 1884. He was consistently committed to establishing a Franco-Russian pact, and directed the embassy in Paris towards that end. After over a decade in the post, Mohrenheim retired in 1897 and was appointed to the Russian State Council.

Mohrenheim was awarded the Orders of Saint Alexander Nevsky, the White Eagle, Saint Anna (1st class), and Saint Stanislaus (1st class).

References

1824 births
1906 deaths
Ambassadors of the Russian Empire to France
Ambassadors of the Russian Empire to the United Kingdom
Barons of the Russian Empire
Diplomats from Moscow
Imperial Moscow University alumni
Members of the State Council (Russian Empire)
Ambassadors of the Russian Empire to Denmark
Barons of Austria